Julius Edward Roehr was a member of the Wisconsin State Senate.

Biography
Roehr was born on March 6, 1860, in Brooklyn, New York. He moved to Wisconsin in 1873, settling in Milwaukee, Wisconsin. Roehr graduated from the University of Wisconsin-Madison and began practicing law. He died in Milwaukee on January 31, 1930.

Political career
Roehr was an unsuccessful candidate for the Wisconsin State Assembly in 1892. That year, he was also a candidate to be a superior court judge. He was a delegate to the 1896 Republican National Convention before serving as a member of the Senate from 1897 to 1908.

References

External links
The Political Graveyard
Wisconsin Historical Society

People from Brooklyn
Politicians from Milwaukee
Republican Party Wisconsin state senators
Wisconsin lawyers
University of Wisconsin–Madison alumni
1860 births
1930 deaths
Lawyers from Milwaukee